Snooker world rankings 2003/2004: The professional world rankings for the top 64 snooker players in the 2003–04 season are listed below.

References

2003
Rankings 2004
Rankings 2003